The Tomb of the Unknown Soldier (French: Tombe du Soldat Inconnu) is a tomb situated before the National War Memorial in Confederation Square, Ottawa, Ontario. The tomb is dedicated to Canadian service members, and holds the remains of an unidentified Canadian soldier who died in France during the First World War; selected from a Commonwealth War Grave near Vimy, in the vicinity where the Battle of Vimy Ridge took place.

A tomb with an unidentified soldier was added to the National War Memorial in 2000, the culmination of a project begun by the Royal Canadian Legion. Since 2007, the Canadian Armed Forces have posted sentries at the tomb, and the National War Memorial, from April to November.

Unknown soldier
At the request of the Royal Canadian Legion, the Canadian government became part of the project of creating a tomb of the unknown soldier for Canada, as part of the Canada Millennium Partnership Program. The Cabinet asked the Commonwealth War Graves Commission to select one of the 1,603 graves of unknown Canadians buried in the vicinity of Vimy Ridge. Chosen was Grave 7, in Row E of Plot 8 of the Cabaret-Rouge British Cemetery in Souchez, France, near the memorial at Vimy Ridge, the site of the first major battle where all four Canadian divisions fought together as a combined force. The remains of the soldier buried there were exhumed on the morning of May 16, 2000, and the coffin was flown in a Canadian Forces aircraft to Ottawa on May 25, accompanied by a 45-person guard of honour, a chaplain, Royal Canadian Legion veterans, and two representatives of Canadian youth. In Ottawa, the unknown soldier lay in state for three days in the Hall of Honour in the Centre Block on Parliament Hill.

On the afternoon of May 28, the body of the unknown soldier was transported to the National War Memorial on a horse-drawn Royal Canadian Mounted Police (RCMP) gun carriage. Governor General Adrienne Clarkson, her husband, and Prime Minister Jean Chrétien, as well as veterans, Canadian Forces personnel, and members of the RCMP were in the funeral cortege. Then, with full military honours before a crowd of 20,000, the body, in a silver maple casket, was re-interred in a sarcophagus in front of the war memorial. Legionnaires placed a handful of soil from each of Canada's provinces and territories, as well as from the soldier's former grave site, on the casket before the tomb was sealed.

The original headstone of the unknown soldier is the sole artifact and the focal point of the Memorial Hall exhibit within the Canadian War Museum. The hall was designed in such a way that sunlight will only frame the headstone once each year on the 11th of November at 11:00 am. At the former burial site of the unknown soldier, a grave marker similar to the other headstones in the Cabaret-Rouge Cemetery was placed at the now-empty grave. It is inscribed with these words:

Tomb

The tomb is intended to honour the approximately 116,000 Canadians who died in combat, as well as all members of the Canadian Armed Forces—in all branches—who died or may die in all conflicts, past, present, and future. The granite was selected for its colour—matching that of the war memorial. The bronze work—showing a medieval sword, a First World War helmet, and branches of maple and laurel leaves (symbolizing both victory and death)—was designed by Canadian artist Mary-Ann Liu and cast in Roberts Creek, British Columbia. Three of the corner pieces show the different variants of the Memorial Cross during the reigns of three Canadian monarchs since the cross' inception—George V, George VI, and Elizabeth II—while the fourth is a poppy.

The design, chosen by a committee from six submissions by Canadian artists, reflects some of the themes and style of the Vimy Memorial, designed by Walter Seymour Allward. The site is maintained by Public Works and Government Services Canada.

The tomb has become a focal point at all commemorative events at the National War Memorial. At the first Remembrance Day following the tomb's installation, what became a tradition started spontaneously as attendees placed their poppies on the tomb. This act expanded to include the leaving of cut flowers, photographs, or letters to the deceased. The spontaneous display of respect has also carried over to Canada Day when the public leaves small, paper national flags on the tomb.

The Royal Canadian Legion commissioned in 2001 a small work of art on the theme of the Tomb of the Unknown Soldier by André Gauthier.

Sentries
Since 2007, a pair of sentries from the Ceremonial Guard, in full dress uniform and with unloaded weapons, have been stationed at the tomb, on rotation from 9 am to 5 pm. Originally, the programme ran only through July and August. This was expanded in 2014 to run from April 9 (the date of the start of the Battle of Vimy Ridge) to November 10, as well as during significant military anniversaries throughout the rest of the year.

Each morning, the first sentries are marched out with a duty piper and, upon taking their posts, are read their orders by the posting non-commissioned member: both are ordered arms and to stand at ease, weapon thrust out to the full extent of the right arm, head up, and feet 30 inches apart. Sentries hold their post for one hour before being replaced, though, a sentry may stand for two shifts in a day. Sentries on duty may march their beat, which consists of the senior sentry giving a sharp tap on the ground with his or her rifle butt, then acknowledged by the other sentry with a tap of his or her own rifle. A two-three pause between each movement, both sentries then come to attention, take a pace forward, shoulder their rifles, turn outwards, and start marching their beat of nine paces. At the ninth pace, both execute an about-turn and return to their original position, if a halt is signalled. Marching the beat can continue for the full hour if desired. Sentries may not interact with the public.

As the Ceremonial Guard is drawn from all branches of the Canadian Forces (the units chosen via an established rotation), the sentries, too, can be members of the Canadian Army, Royal Canadian Navy, or Royal Canadian Air Force, as well as the Special Operations Command. The commanding officer of each unit decides who will be sent to Ottawa. Occasionally, members of a police force will act as sentries at the tomb, such as when officers from the Royal Canadian Mounted Police did so on July 5, 2013, to honour Sergeant Arthur Richardson, a member of the North-West Mounted Police, who earned the Victoria Cross serving with Lord Strathcona's Horse during the Second Boer War.

Incidents

2006 urination incident
The Royal Canadian Legion leadership opined that the tomb deserved a military or police guard as a symbol of respect and to protect it from vandalism and desecration. These demands were brought into focus on the night of July 1, 2006, when Dr. Michael Pilon, a retired Canadian Forces major, photographed three young men urinating on the war memorial shortly after the annual Canada Day fireworks show over nearby Parliament Hill. In the summer of 2007, the sentry programme was instituted.

2014 shootings at Parliament Hill

On October 22, 2014, a man armed with a rifle shot at the sentries on duty at the tomb, fatally wounding Corporal Nathan Cirillo of The Argyll and Sutherland Highlanders of Canada (Princess Louise's), before proceeding across the street and into the Centre Block on nearby Parliament Hill. There, the shooter engaged in a firefight with Sergeant-at-Arms of the House of Commons Kevin Vickers and members of the Royal Canadian Mounted Police, which ended when he was killed by RCMP Constable Curtis Barrett.

2022 convoy protests
On the weekend of January 29, 2022, individuals participating in the Canada convoy protest against COVID-19 mandates danced on the statue, on the tomb, and parked vehicles on the surrounding grounds. The incident was criticized by military officials, politicians, and the Private Motor Truck Council of Canada.

See also

 Canadian war memorials
 Military history of Canada
 Tomb of the Unknown Soldier

References

External links

 Tomb of the Unknown Soldier, Veterans Affairs Canada

2000 in Canada
Canadian military memorials and cemeteries
+
Military history of Canada
Monuments and memorials in Ottawa
World War I memorials in Canada
Tombs of Unknown Soldiers
2000 establishments in Ontario